Vasil Dobrev (born 5 January 1998) is a Bulgarian professional footballer who plays as a defender.

Career

Septemvri Sofia
Dobrev made his debut for the team on 16 October 2016 in league match against Vitosha Bistritsa. He completed his professional debut in the First League on 27 August 2017 in a 4:1 win over Cherno More.

On 10 September 2019 he signed for Spartak Varna, on loan from Septemvri until end of the season.

International career

Youth levels
Dobrev was called up for the Bulgaria U19 team for the 2017 European Under-19 Championship qualification from 22 to 27 March 2017. Playing in all three matches, Bulgaria qualified for the knockout phase.

Career statistics

Club

References

External links

Living people
1998 births
Sportspeople from Burgas
Bulgarian footballers
Association football defenders
FC Pirin Razlog players
FC Septemvri Sofia players
FC Arda Kardzhali players
PFC Spartak Varna players
PFC Slavia Sofia players
FC Botev Vratsa players
First Professional Football League (Bulgaria) players